Henry Howell was an American Negro league pitcher between 1918 and 1921.

Howell made his Negro leagues debut in 1918 with the Bacharach Giants and the Pennsylvania Red Caps of New York. He went on to play for the Brooklyn Royal Giants in 1919 and 1921.

References

External links
 and Seamheads

Year of birth missing
Year of death missing
Place of birth missing
Place of death missing
Bacharach Giants players
Brooklyn Royal Giants players
Pennsylvania Red Caps of New York players
Baseball pitchers